Thurles Sarsfields is a Tipperary GAA club which is located in County Tipperary, Ireland. Both hurling and Gaelic football are played in the "Mid-Tipperary" divisional competitions. The club is centred in the town of Thurles at Semple Stadium. The club was founded in 1881 and is the most honoured club in the history of the county championship with 36 County Titles.

Their Underage Section is called Dúrlas Og and as they go past Minor they become Thurles Sarrsfield

History
On 19 October 2009, Sarsfields captured their 30th Tipperary Senior Hurling Championship, defeating neighbours Drom ’n Inch at Semple Stadium by 0-14 to 0-5. They went on to play Newtownshandrum in the Munster hurling championship quarter-final on 1 November 2009, losing by 1-15 to 0-19 points. On 31 October 2010, Sarsfields captured their 31st Tipperary Senior Hurling Championship after a 1-16 to 1-7 win against Clonoulty-Rossmore. They subsequently contested the Munster Club hurling final only to lose out to De La Salle.

On 25 November 2012, Thurles won their first ever Munster GAA Senior Club Hurling Championship after a 1-21 to 1-16 victory over De La Salle in the final at Páirc Uí Chaoimh.

Hurling

Honours

Munster Senior Club Hurling Championships:  1
 2012
Tipperary Senior Hurling Championships:  36
 1887, 1904, 1906, 1907, 1908, 1909, 1911, 1929, 1935, 1936, 1938, 1939, 1942, 1944, 1945, 1946, 1952, 1955, 1956, 1957, 1958, 1959, 1961, 1962, 1963, 1964, 1965, 1974, 2005, 2009, 2010, 2012, 2014, 2015,2016 2017	
 Mid Tipperary Senior Hurling Championship (46)
 1907, 1908, 1909, 1911, 1912, 1915, 1920 (as Moycarkey-Thurles), 1925, 1929, 1935, 1936, 1938, 1939, 1942, 1944, 1945, 1946, 1950, 1952, 1955, 1956, 1957, 1958, 1959, 1960, 1961, 1962, 1963, 1964, 1965, 1968, 1969, 1973, 1975, 1979, 1980, 1993, 1996, 2000, 2001, 2005, 2007, 2010, 2012, 2015, 2017
 Mid Tipperary Intermediate Hurling Championship (3)
 1989, 2014, 2016
 Tipperary Junior A Hurling Championship (5)
 1955, 1956, 1958, 1987, 1995
 Mid Tipperary Junior A Hurling Championship (12)
 1939, 1942, 1948, 1955, 1956, 1957, 1958, 1981, 1987, 1994, 1995, 2014, 2019
 All Ireland Junior B Championship (1)
 2018
 Tipperary Junior B Hurling Championship (3)
 2002, 2010, 2017
 Mid Tipperary Junior B Hurling Championship (4)
 2002, 2009, 2010, 2017
Tipperary Under-21 Hurling Championships:  8
 1988, 2002, 2008, 2009, 2012, 2013, 2015, 2016
Mid Tipperary Under-21 A Hurling Championships: (23)
 1961, 1968, 1969, 1970, 1974, 1976, 1980, 1988, 1989, 1990, 1992, 1995, 1997, 2002, 2003, 2006, 2008, 2009, 2010, 2012, 2013, 2015, 2016
Tipperary Minor A Hurling Championships:  11
 1954, 1955, 1956, 1957, 1973, 1985, 1999, 2000, 2001, 2006, 2007, 2010
Mid Tipperary Minor A Hurling Championships: (21)
 1954, 1955, 1956, 1957, 1958, 1967, 1973, 1980, 1985, 1987, 1988, 1989, 1992, 1994, 1995, 1999, 2001, 2001, 2006, 2007, 2010

Notable club players

This means players that have enjoyed much success with the club or have played for the Tipperary senior hurling team.

Football

Honours
 Mid Tipperary Senior Football Championship (1)
 1952
 Mid Tipperary Intermediate Football Championship (7)
 1990, 1991, 1994, 1999, 2000, 2006, 2009
 Tipperary Junior A Football Championship (2)
 1989, 2022
 Mid Tipperary Junior A Football Championship (10)
 1943, 1945, 1967, 1983, 1985, 1989, 1998, 2015, 2021, 2022
 Mid Tipperary Junior B Football Championship (1)
 1995
 Mid Tipperary Under-21 A Football Championship (3)
 1991, 1993, 2007
Mid Tipperary Under 19 B Football Championship (1) 
 2022
 Tipperary Minor A Football Championship (2)
 2005, 2006
 Mid Tipperary Minor A Football Championship (10)
 1949, 1953, 1954, 1983, 1988, 1989, 1993, 2005, 2006, 2019 
 Mid Tipperary Minor B Football Championship (1)
 1991

References

External links

Tipperary GAA site
Official Thurles Sarsfields GAA Club website

Hurling clubs in County Tipperary
Gaelic games clubs in County Tipperary
Sport in Thurles